The 2003–04 NBA season was the Raptors' ninth season in the National Basketball Association. This season saw the team draft future All-Star forward Chris Bosh with the fourth overall pick in the 2003 NBA draft. With new head coach Kevin O'Neill, the Raptors started the season on a high note beating the 2-time Eastern Conference Champion New Jersey Nets 90–87. However, a few days later they would set an embarrassing post shot clock record by scoring just 56 points in a loss to the Minnesota Timberwolves. After the first month of the season, they traded Antonio Davis and Jerome Williams to the Chicago Bulls for Jalen Rose and Donyell Marshall. The Raptors posted a 25–25 record at the All-Star break, but largely because of injuries, they only won just eight for the rest of the season. The team also posted nine and seven-game losing streaks respectively, finishing sixth in the Central Division with a 33–49 record.

Following the season, O'Neil and General Manager Glen Grunwald were fired by the Raptors. This was also Vince Carter's final full season in Toronto, as he would be traded to the New Jersey Nets midway through next season. He was also selected for the 2004 NBA All-Star Game.

For this season, they added new red road alternate uniforms with black and grey side panels to their jerseys and shorts. They were designed by singer Shania Twain, their alternate uniforms they remained in used until 2006, when they became primary road jersey remained in used until 2015.

NBA Draft

Roster

Regular season

Highs
After acquiring Jalen Rose in a mid-November deal, the Raptors went on to win five straight games.

Lows

After the 50 game mark, the Raptors were 25-25 and in position for a playoff spot. Unfortunately, the team would struggle out towards the end, finishing 8-24 and missing the playoffs. Kevin O'Neill was fired after the season.

Standings

Record vs. opponents

Game log

|- bgcolor="bbffbb"
| 1
| October 29
| New Jersey
| 
| Vince Carter (39)
| Antonio Davis, Jerome Williams (14)
| Lamond Murray, Milt Palacio (4)
| Air Canada Centre18,217
| 1–0
|- bgcolor="bbffbb"
| 2
| October 31
| Washington
| 
| Vince Carter (26)
| Antonio Davis (15)
| Milt Palacio, Alvin Williams (6)
| Air Canada Centre14,183
| 2–0

|- bgcolor="ffcccc"
| 3
| November 1
| @ Minnesota
| 
| Vince Carter (15)
| Jerome Williams (16)
| Vince Carter, Alvin Williams (3)
| Target Center15,869
| 2–1
|- bgcolor="bbffbb"
| 4
| November 6
| Dallas
| 
| Vince Carter (19)
| Antonio Davis (12)
| Milt Palacio (7)
| Air Canada Centre17,556
| 3–1
|- bgcolor="ffcccc"
| 5
| November 7
| @ Washington
| 
| Vince Carter (18)
| Jerome Williams (13)
| Alvin Williams (6)
| MCI Center20,173
| 3–2
|- bgcolor="bbffbb"
| 6
| November 9
| Denver
| 
| Vince Carter (34)
| Jerome Williams (13)
| Vince Carter, Milt Palacio (6)
| Air Canada Centre16,888
| 4–2
|- bgcolor="ffcccc"
| 7
| November 11
| @ Portland
| 
| Vince Carter (33)
| Antonio Davis (11)
| Milt Palacio (10)
| Rose Garden14,082
| 4–3
|- bgcolor="ffcccc"
| 8
| November 12
| @ L.A. Lakers
| 
| Vince Carter (23)
| Chris Bosh, Antonio Davis, Jerome Williams (8)
| Vince Carter, Milt Palacio (4)
| Staples Center18,997
| 4–4
|- bgcolor="ffcccc"
| 9
| November 14
| @ Sacramento
| 
| Vince Carter, Lamond Murray (13)
| Antonio Davis (10)
| Milt Palacio, Morris Peterson, Alvin Williams (2)
| ARCO Arena17,317
| 4–5
|- bgcolor="bbffbb"
| 10
| November 16
| Houston
| 
| Chris Bosh (25)
| Jerome Williams (11)
| Vince Carter (9)
| Air Canada Centre19,547
| 5–5
|- bgcolor="ffcccc"
| 11
| November 19
| Philadelphia
| 
| Vince Carter (20)
| Antonio Davis (9)
| Vince Carter (7)
| Air Canada Centre19,800
| 5–6
|- bgcolor="bbffbb"
| 12
| November 22
| @ New Jersey
| 
| Vince Carter (21)
| Chris Bosh, Vince Carter, Jerome Williams (6)
| Vince Carter (9)
| Continental Airlines Arena13,755
| 6–6
|- bgcolor="ffcccc"
| 13
| November 23
| Milwaukee
| 
| Vince Carter (15)
| Antonio Davis, Jerome Williams (9)
| Alvin Williams (6)
| Air Canada Centre17,702
| 6–7
|- bgcolor="bbffbb"
| 14
| November 26
| @ Atlanta
| 
| Vince Carter (43)
| Antonio Davis (11)
| Alvin Williams (6)
| Philips Arena11,730
| 7–7
|- bgcolor="bbffbb"
| 15
| November 28
| @ Orlando
| 
| Vince Carter (20)
| Chris Bosh, Antonio Davis (8)
| Vince Carter (8)
| TD Waterhouse Centre13,375
| 8–7
|- bgcolor="ffcccc"
| 16
| November 29
| @ Miami
| 
| Lamond Murray (14)
| Chris Bosh (10)
| Milt Palacio, Alvin Williams (3)
| American Airlines Arena14,585
| 8–8

|- bgcolor="bbffbb"
| 17
| December 2
| @ Philadelphia
| 
| Donyell Marshall (27)
| Chris Bosh (11)
| Vince Carter (12)
| Wachovia Center17,899
| 9–8
|- bgcolor="bbffbb"
| 18
| December 3
| Boston
| 
| Vince Carter, Donyell Marshall (21)
| Lonny Baxter (9)
| Vince Carter (10)
| Air Canada Centre18,552
| 10–8
|- bgcolor="bbffbb"
| 19
| December 5
| Atlanta
| 
| Vince Carter, Jalen Rose (22)
| Jalen Rose (8)
| Jalen Rose (10)
| Air Canada Centre17,559
| 11–8
|- bgcolor="bbffbb"
| 20
| December 7
| Seattle
| 
| Vince Carter (30)
| Chris Bosh (16)
| Jalen Rose (10)
| Air Canada Centre17,779
| 12–8
|- bgcolor="bbffbb"
| 21
| December 9
| @ Cleveland
| 
| Vince Carter (22)
| Vince Carter (8)
| Vince Carter (7)
| Gund Arena16,939
| 13–8
|- bgcolor="ffcccc"
| 22
| December 12
| @ Boston
| 
| Vince Carter (35)
| Donyell Marshall (9)
| Jalen Rose (14)
| FleetCenter15,003
| 13–9
|- bgcolor="ffcccc"
| 23
| December 14
| Miami
| 
| Donyell Marshall (25)
| Chris Bosh (10)
| Alvin Williams (9)
| Air Canada Centre17,950
| 13–10
|- bgcolor="ffcccc"
| 24
| December 15
| @ Dallas
| 
| Vince Carter (21)
| Lonny Baxter (10)
| Vince Carter (5)
| American Airlines Center19,846
| 13–11
|- bgcolor="ffcccc"
| 25
| December 17
| @ San Antonio
| 
| Donyell Marshall (19)
| Donyell Marshall (14)
| Alvin Williams (7)
| SBC Center16,375
| 13–12
|- bgcolor="bbffbb"
| 26
| December 19
| New York
| 
| Jalen Rose (21)
| Donyell Marshall (19)
| Vince Carter (8)
| Air Canada Centre19,233
| 14–12
|- bgcolor="ffcccc"
| 27
| December 21
| Orlando
| 
| Donyell Marshall (19)
| Donyell Marshall (19)
| Alvin Williams (8)
| Air Canada Centre19,800
| 14–13
|- bgcolor="ffcccc"
| 28
| December 26
| @ Utah
| 
| Vince Carter (30)
| Chris Bosh, Vince Carter (7)
| Jalen Rose (8)
| Delta Center19,639
| 14–14
|- bgcolor="bbffbb"
| 29
| December 28
| @ L.A. Clippers
| 
| Jalen Rose (23)
| Donyell Marshall (9)
| Vince Carter (5)
| Staples Center14,311
| 15–14
|- bgcolor="bbffbb"
| 30
| December 30
| @ Denver
| 
| Jalen Rose, Alvin Williams (17)
| Donyell Marshall (13)
| Alvin Williams (6)
| Pepsi Center19,099
| 16–14

|- bgcolor="ffcccc"
| 31
| January 2
| New Orleans
| 
| Vince Carter (22)
| Donyell Marshall (8)
| Vince Carter (4)
| Air Canada Centre19,800
| 16–15
|- bgcolor="bbffbb"
| 32
| January 4
| Phoenix
| 
| Vince Carter (23)
| Donyell Marshall (15)
| Alvin Williams (7)
| Air Canada Centre19,029
| 17–15
|- bgcolor="bbffbb"
| 33
| January 7
| Cleveland
| 
| Vince Carter, Donyell Marshall (14)
| Donyell Marshall (13)
| Vince Carter (5)
| Air Canada Centre19,874
| 18–15
|- bgcolor="ffcccc"
| 34
| January 9
| L.A. Clippers
| 
| Jalen Rose (26)
| Vince Carter (10)
| Alvin Williams (7)
| Air Canada Centre18,405
| 18–16
|- bgcolor="bbffbb"
| 35
| January 11
| Portland
| 
| Vince Carter (20)
| Donyell Marshall (11)
| Vince Carter (7)
| Air Canada Centre18,906
| 19–16
|- bgcolor="ffcccc"
| 36
| January 14
| @ Detroit
| 
| Vince Carter (27)
| Donyell Marshall (16)
| Jalen Rose (8)
| The Palace of Auburn Hills18,473
| 19–17
|- bgcolor="bbffbb"
| 37
| January 15
| @ New Orleans
| 
| Jalen Rose (20)
| Donyell Marshall (12)
| Jalen Rose (6)
| New Orleans Arena14,673
| 20–17
|- bgcolor="ffcccc"
| 38
| January 17
| @ Atlanta
| 
| Donyell Marshall (16)
| Donyell Marshall (12)
| Jalen Rose, Alvin Williams (5)
| Philips Arena13,928
| 20–18
|- bgcolor="ffcccc"
| 39
| January 19
| @ New York
| 
| Jalen Rose (22)
| Donyell Marshall (15)
| Jalen Rose (5)
| Madison Square Garden19,308
| 20–19
|- bgcolor="ffcccc"
| 40
| January 21
| Minnesota
| 
| Donyell Marshall (22)
| Chris Bosh, Donyell Marshall, Jalen Rose (5)
| Milt Palacio, Alvin Williams (4)
| Air Canada Centre18,846
| 20–20
|- bgcolor="ffcccc"
| 41
| January 23
| @ Milwaukee
| 
| Donyell Marshall (17)
| Chris Bosh (6)
| Vince Carter (8)
| Bradley Center15,813
| 20–21
|- bgcolor="ffcccc"
| 42
| January 25
| @ Chicago
| 
| Chris Bosh (23)
| Chris Bosh (10)
| Vince Carter (8)
| United Center22,039
| 20–22
|- bgcolor="bbffbb"
| 43
| January 28
| Philadelphia
| 
| Donyell Marshall (19)
| Donyell Marshall (10)
| Jalen Rose (13)
| Air Canada Centre17,708
| 21–22
|- bgcolor="ffcccc"
| 44
| January 30
| Detroit
| 
| Vince Carter (31)
| Chris Bosh (13)
| Alvin Williams (4)
| Air Canada Centre19,555
| 21–23

|- bgcolor="ffcccc"
| 45
| February 1
| L.A. Lakers
| 
| Vince Carter (27)
| Chris Bosh (14)
| Morris Peterson (4)
| Air Canada Centre20,116
| 21–24
|- bgcolor="bbffbb"
| 46
| February 3
| @ Philadelphia
| 
| Vince Carter (33)
| Donyell Marshall (14)
| Jalen Rose (5)
| Wachovia Center19,049
| 22–24
|- bgcolor="bbffbb"
| 47
| February 4
| Orlando
| 
| Donyell Marshall (32)
| Jérôme Moïso (12)
| Vince Carter (9)
| Air Canada Centre16,228
| 23–24
|- bgcolor="ffcccc"
| 48
| February 6
| Indiana
| 
| Donyell Marshall (24)
| Jérôme Moïso (11)
| Vince Carter (6)
| Air Canada Centre19,311
| 23–25
|- bgcolor="bbffbb"
| 49
| February 8
| @ Golden State
| 
| Vince Carter (22)
| Donyell Marshall (13)
| Vince Carter (4)
| The Arena in Oakland16,873
| 24–25
|- bgcolor="bbffbb"
| 50
| February 10
| @ Phoenix
| 
| Vince Carter (29)
| Donyell Marshall (11)
| Vince Carter (6)
| America West Arena14,138
| 25–25
|- bgcolor="ffcccc"
| 51
| February 12
| @ Seattle
| 
| Alvin Williams (20)
| Donyell Marshall (17)
| Vince Carter (7)
| KeyArena14,239
| 25–26
|- bgcolor="ffcccc"
| 52
| February 17
| @ Chicago
| 
| Vince Carter (21)
| Donyell Marshall (24)
| Alvin Williams (6)
| United Center17,822
| 25–27
|- bgcolor="ffcccc"
| 53
| February 18
| San Antonio
| 
| Vince Carter (22)
| Donyell Marshall (11)
| Vince Carter (6)
| Air Canada Centre17,119
| 25–28
|- bgcolor="ffcccc"
| 54
| February 20
| New Jersey
| 
| Donyell Marshall (17)
| Donyell Marshall (13)
| Alvin Williams (6)
| Air Canada Centre19,301
| 25–29
|- bgcolor="ffcccc"
| 55
| February 22
| Sacramento
| 
| Chris Bosh (20)
| Donyell Marshall (13)
| Alvin Williams (9)
| Air Canada Centre19,800
| 25–30
|- bgcolor="ffcccc"
| 56
| February 24
| @ New Jersey
| 
| Roger Mason (18)
| Jérôme Moïso, Morris Peterson (6)
| Milt Palacio (5)
| Continental Airlines Arena12,829
| 25–31
|- bgcolor="ffcccc"
| 57
| February 25
| Washington
| 
| Donyell Marshall (20)
| Chris Bosh (9)
| Roger Mason (6)
| Air Canada Centre17,291
| 25–32
|- bgcolor="ffcccc"
| 58
| February 27
| @ Boston
| 
| Donyell Marshall (19)
| Donyell Marshall (13)
| Roger Mason, Milt Palacio (4)
| FleetCenter16,681
| 25–33
|- bgcolor="ffcccc"
| 59
| February 29
| Boston
| 
| Milt Palacio (19)
| Donyell Marshall (10)
| Milt Palacio (8)
| Air Canada Centre19,256
| 25–34

|- bgcolor="bbffbb"
| 60
| March 2
| @ Miami
| 
| Vince Carter (27)
| Chris Bosh (9)
| Vince Carter (8)
| American Airlines Arena14,178
| 26–34
|- bgcolor="ffcccc"
| 61
| March 3
| @ Washington
| 
| Donyell Marshall (22)
| Donyell Marshall (10)
| Milt Palacio (8)
| MCI Center13,921
| 26–35
|- bgcolor="ffcccc"
| 62
| March 5
| New York
| 
| Vince Carter (32)
| Donyell Marshall (11)
| Vince Carter (9)
| Air Canada Centre19,287
| 26–36
|- bgcolor="bbffbb"
| 63
| March 7
| New Orleans
| 
| Vince Carter (26)
| Donyell Marshall (14)
| Vince Carter (8)
| Air Canada Centre17,031
| 27–36
|- bgcolor="ffcccc"
| 64
| March 9
| @ Indiana
| 
| Vince Carter (28)
| Donyell Marshall (13)
| Rod Strickland (16)
| Conseco Fieldhouse15,123
| 27–37
|- bgcolor="ffcccc"
| 65
| March 10
| Cleveland
| 
| Vince Carter (19)
| Donyell Marshall (12)
| Rod Strickland (6)
| Air Canada Centre17,459
| 27–38
|- bgcolor="bbffbb"
| 66
| March 14
| Atlanta
| 
| Vince Carter (32)
| Chris Bosh (16)
| Vince Carter, Jalen Rose (7)
| Air Canada Centre17,628
| 28–38
|- bgcolor="bbffbb"
| 67
| March 17
| Utah
| 
| Vince Carter (24)
| Vince Carter (9)
| Jalen Rose (6)
| Air Canada Centre17,875
| 29–38
|- bgcolor="ffcccc"
| 68
| March 19
| Chicago
| 
| Vince Carter (30)
| Chris Bosh (14)
| Jalen Rose (6)
| Air Canada Centre19,348
| 29–39
|- bgcolor="bbffbb"
| 69
| March 21
| @ New Orleans
| 
| Vince Carter (42)
| Donyell Marshall (7)
| Vince Carter (12)
| New Orleans Arena14,307
| 30–39
|- bgcolor="ffcccc"
| 70
| March 23
| @ Memphis
| 
| Vince Carter (30)
| Donyell Marshall (17)
| Jalen Rose (5)
| Pyramid Arena13,191
| 30–40
|- bgcolor="ffcccc"
| 71
| March 24
| @ Houston
| 
| Vince Carter (26)
| Vince Carter (13)
| Jalen Rose (7)
| Toyota Center14,388
| 30–41
|- bgcolor="ffcccc"
| 72
| March 26
| @ New York
| 
| Vince Carter (40)
| Chris Bosh (9)
| Jalen Rose (9)
| Madison Square Garden19,763
| 30–42
|- bgcolor="ffcccc"
| 73
| March 28
| Memphis
| 
| Jalen Rose (18)
| Donyell Marshall (14)
| Vince Carter (9)
| Air Canada Centre19,088
| 30–43
|- bgcolor="ffcccc"
| 74
| March 31
| Golden State
| 
| Vince Carter (22)
| Donyell Marshall (16)
| Jalen Rose (4)
| Air Canada Centre17,116
| 30–44

|- bgcolor="ffcccc"
| 75
| April 2
| @ Indiana
| 
| Jalen Rose (22)
| Chris Bosh (7)
| Rod Strickland (4)
| Conseco Fieldhouse17,775
| 30–45
|- bgcolor="ffcccc"
| 76
| April 4
| Milwaukee
| 
| Jalen Rose (21)
| Donyell Marshall (16)
| Jalen Rose (7)
| Air Canada Centre17,276
| 30–46
|- bgcolor="bbffbb"
| 77
| April 6
| @ Cleveland
| 
| Vince Carter (32)
| Donyell Marshall (11)
| Jalen Rose (6)
| Gund Arena20,071
| 31–46
|- bgcolor="ffcccc"
| 78
| April 7
| Indiana
| 
| Donyell Marshall (26)
| Donyell Marshall (10)
| Jalen Rose (8)
| Air Canada Centre17,554
| 31–47
|- bgcolor="ffcccc"
| 79
| April 9
| @ Detroit
| 
| Chris Bosh, Vince Carter (18)
| Donyell Marshall (11)
| Vince Carter (5)
| The Palace of Auburn Hills22,076
| 31–48
|- bgcolor="ffcccc"
| 80
| April 11
| Chicago
| 
| Jalen Rose (32)
| Donyell Marshall (16)
| Jalen Rose (6)
| Air Canada Centre17,362
| 31–49
|- bgcolor="bbffbb"
| 81
| April 13
| Detroit
| 
| Donyell Marshall (27)
| Donyell Marshall (16)
| Morris Peterson, Jalen Rose (5)
| Air Canada Centre18,273
| 32–49
|- bgcolor="bbffbb"
| 82
| April 14
| @ Milwaukee
| 
| Vince Carter (23)
| Donyell Marshall (13)
| Jalen Rose (6)
| Bradley Center16,065
| 33–49

Player statistics

Regular season

* Statistics include only games with the Raptors

Award winners
 Vince Carter, NBA All-Star Game Appearance, (Starter)
 Chris Bosh, NBA All-Star Rookie-Sophomore Game Appearance (Rookie)
 Chris Bosh, NBA All-Rookie First Team

References

External links
 
 

Toronto Raptors seasons
Toronto
Tor